A regional fishery body (RFB) is a type of international organization that is dedicated to the sustainability of fishery resources in a particular region, or of highly migratory species, whose such capacity has been recognized by the UN Food and Agriculture Organization. An RFB is classified as one of the following two types:
 regional fishery management organisation (RFMO)
 regional fishery advisory body (RFAB).

RFABs issue non-binding recommendations only, but they are usually organised as more independent, impartial expert bodies, expected to be guided by science rather than political interests of its members. RFMOs are in turn more politicised, but their decisions are binding for the members and subject to enforcement. Therefore, the usually science-focused recommendations issued by the relatively independent RFABs often constitute the scientific input to the RMFOs, where they are subject to political negotiations between the members, in order to adjust them to social and economic reality and to translate them into politically acceptable and tenable binding decisions, which the RMFOs subsequently enforce. In some regions where there are only few actors and they are willing to cooperate on a non-confrontational basis, they may choose to establish a regional fishery management arrangement (RFMA) exercised directly by them rather than to form a more expensive incorporated RFMO.

Regional fishery management organisation
A regional fishery management organisation (RFMO) is a type of RFB entrusted with sustainable management of fish stocks in a particular region, or of highly migratory species.

RFMOs may be classified as belonging to one or more of the three types:
 General or generic RFMOs which have a wider remit related to living marine resources in general within a region; examples include:
 Commission for the Conservation of Antarctic Marine Living Resources
 General Fisheries Commission for the Mediterranean
 North East Atlantic Fisheries Commission
 Northwest Atlantic Fisheries Organization
 North Pacific Fisheries Commission
 South East Atlantic Fisheries Organisation
 South Pacific Regional Fisheries Management Organisation
 Southern Indian Ocean Fisheries Agreement
 Western and Central Pacific Fisheries Commission
 Tuna RFMOs are the 5 RFMOs managing tuna stocks:
 Commission for the Conservation of Southern Bluefin Tuna) 
 International Commission for the Conservation of Atlantic Tunas
 Indian Ocean Tuna Commission
 Inter-American Tropical Tuna Commission
 Western and Central Pacific Fisheries Commission
 Specialised RFMOs manage certain other species of marine fauna; examples include:
 North Atlantic Salmon Conservation Organization
 International Whaling Commission

This wide diversity of mandates and areas of application, and also effective implementation of regulations, opens up opportunities to combat illegal, unreported and unregulated fishing vessels, though there are also opinions that the system is ineffective.

Alternative arrangements
A regional fishery management arrangement denotes an international fishery agreement which refrains from establishing a formal regional fishery body, while the fishery management is exercised instead directly by the contracting parties, an option limited mostly to cases where there are only two actors in a basin. An example is the Baltic sea where, due to reduction in 2004 in the number of actors in the basin from six to just two, the formerly existing general RMFO (the International Baltic Sea Fisheries Commission) was dissolved in 2007, while according to the new general regional fishery management arrangement, the fishery management tasks have been taken over directly by the two extant actors in the basin, namely the EU and Russia. Nevertheless, the sea has still remained under management by a tuna RMFO (ICCAT) and two other specialised RFMOs dedicated to salmon (NASCO) and whaling (IWC).

References

External links 
 The official UN FAO directory of all recognised RFMOs by type, as well as RFABs 
 RFMOs on the Ministry of Fisheries and Oceans Canada General information and map of RFMOs
 Fish stock status Ministry for Primary Industries New Zealand Information, Problems and possible improvements
 Informal framework for sharing information from tuna RFMOs

Fisheries agencies
International economic organizations